Seth Lochhead is a Canadian screenwriter. He is best known for writing the 2011 film Hanna with David Farr.

Career
Lochhead attended Vancouver Film School's Writing for Film & Television program, where he wrote his first screenplay, Hanna, while he was in his early 20s. He completed the script after leaving film school and in 2006 it was listed on the Hollywood Black List of the best unproduced scripts in Hollywood. Lochhead sold the screenplay to Focus Features in March 2007, although he received a much higher bid from another American production company. Hanna was directed by Joe Wright and released in 2011 after being in development for a total of six years. Lochhead shared the writing credit with David Farr, a British writer and theatre director, who wrote another draft of the film during its development but whom Lochhead does not personally know. He has been chosen to write for the upcoming Shadow of the Colossus movie.

Before Hanna had been produced, Lochhead was approached to pitch himself as a writer for Sherlock Holmes: A Game of Shadows and a film adaptation of the Masters of the Universe series featuring He-Man. He has written several screenplays since Hanna, including Cadar, which was sold to Spitfire Pictures, and Governess, which was picked up by Warner Bros. with Michael Bay as a producer. He has considered becoming a film director in addition to screenwriting, as well as relocating to Los Angeles.

Personal life
Lochhead currently lives in Vancouver with his girlfriend.

His mother is a feminist and his father is a skilled fisherman and carpenter; Lochhead has said they both influenced his self-sufficiency.

References

External links

1981 births
Canadian male screenwriters
Living people
People from Nanaimo
Vancouver Film School alumni
Writers from Vancouver
21st-century Canadian male writers
21st-century Canadian screenwriters